Gaibandha Sadar is an upazila of Gaibandha District in the Division of Rangpur Division, Bangladesh.

Geography
It has 68,483 households and a total area of 320.25 km2.

Demographics
According to the 1991 Bangladesh census, Gaibandha Sadar had a population of 359,226, of whom 172,249 were aged 18 or over. Males constituted 50.6% of the population, and females 49.4%. Gaibandha Sadar had an average literacy rate of 28.2% (7+ years), against the national average of 32.4% .

Administration
Gaibandha Sadar Upazila is divided into Gaibandha Municipality and 13 union parishads: Badiakhali, Ballamjhar, Boali, Ghagoa, Gidari, Kamarjani, Kholahati, Kuptola, Laxmipur, Malibari, Mollarchar, Ramchandrapur, and Shahapara. The union parishads are subdivided into 130 mauzas and 144 villages.

Gaibandha Municipality is subdivided into 9 wards and 35 mahallas.

Education

Ahammad Uddin Shah Shishu Niketon School & College, founded in 1982 is a significant educational institution. & according to Banglapedia, Gaibandha Government Boys' High School, founded in 1885, is a notable secondary school.

Notable people
Dr. Md. Abdus Salam Akanda, a renowned Statistician, Professor of University of Dhaka and Writer.

Mahabub Elahi Ronju, Bir Protik valiant freedom fighter and company commander of 'Ronju company of Mukti Bahini' at Gaibandha area during the glorious liberation war of Bangladesh in 1971.

References

Upazilas of Gaibandha District